Slap of Reality is an American melodic punk/hardcore band from Tampa, Florida.

History 
Forming in late 1987, Slap of Reality were one of the pioneers of the melodic hardcore sound. The band released two albums and three EPs. After performing with 7 Seconds, Slapshot, Fugazi, Jawbox, MDC, Samiam, and The Goo Goo Dolls, the band developed a strong following.

Kevin Seconds, the frontman for 7 Seconds, signed Slap of Reality to his Pazzafist Records label. The group later signed a deal with Headhunter Records. The band broke up in 1992, and members formed Failure Face, Balance, Paineater, Scrotum Grinder, Hankshaw, and Murder-Suicide Pact, The Sophomore Effort, and Exitsect(which features Paul Pavlovich (Assück), Sam Williams (Down By Law), Greg Gall (Six Feet Under) and Frank Watkins (Obituary, Gorgoroth). The band reformed in 1995 after increasing interest from Elektra Records. 

The band relocated to New York City before disbanding again in 1996. They have since released two singles; "Never Far" in 2018, and "A Part Of" in 2019. The band later signed with Florida’s A Jam Records, which is co-owned by Joe Koontz of Against All Authority. A three song EP titled “Gaslight” was released in 2019

Discography 
1989 - Slap of Reality - Stuck Inside EP (Vinyl Communications)
1990 - Slap of Reality - Time Alone EP (Pazzafist)
1991 - Slap of Reality - Fletch EP (Snoop)
1991 - Slap of Reality - 3 Lefts Make a Right LP (Headhunter/Cargo)
1992 - Slap of Reality - "We Do Not Have a Dinosaur" EP ([Break Even Point|Cargo Records])
1995 - Slap of Reality - Drowned Out EP (Skene!)
1995 - Slap of Reality - Monkeydust LP (Runt)
2018 - Slap Of Reality - "Never Far" Single
2019 - Slap Of Reality - "A Part Of" Single

Compilations 
1991 - Slap of Reality - Cargo Records Sampler - (Headhunter/Cargo) - "Walk Away"

References 

Punk rock groups from Florida
Musical groups from Tampa, Florida